Milesia afra  is a species of hoverfly in the family Syrphidae.

Distribution
The species can be found in the Congo.

References

Insects described in 1955
Eristalinae
Diptera of Africa